Dragan Tanasijević (born 26 April 1959 in Belgrade) is a prominent Serbian photographer who has received numerous awards. Some of his work includes portraits of royal families and religious leaders. His works are an integral part of private collections and museum galleries in Serbia and around the world. His photographs, apart from being a valuable glimpse into the lives of different famous people from the present, they also represent a specific artistic view of the portrayed individuals.

For the past 39 years he has participated in over 860 group exhibitions at home and abroad and received over 80 awards. In total there have been 56 solo exhibitions of his work. From 1994 until 2009, he dispersed over 100 photographic presentations – his most well-known presentation was of projection slides in color, on Mount Athos and the monastery Hilandar. Aside from exhibiting work, he has also helped design, coach, and been a jury member in different exhibitions across the world. Many of his works have become part of private and museum collections, both domestic and international.

Tanasijević started his photography career in 1973, five years before opening his first public exhibitions in 1978. In 1980, he got qualification for instructor and educator of photography.  He earned a membership in The Applied Artists and Designers Association of Serbia (ULUPUDS) in 1987. He was part of ULUPUDS as a president of the photography section from 12 October 1995 to 11 November 1997.

Works The Applied Artists and Designers Association of Serbia

Study tours
 1987 – Corsica, France
 1992 – Sri Lanka
 1993 – Venice, Italy
 1995 – 1999 Decani Monastery – Kosovo and Metohija
 1994 – 2007 – Athos, Greece
 2009 – Jerusalem, Israel, Holy Land

Photo monography
 1998 – Approaching Hilandar
 2000 – Guardians of Sacred
 2003 – Crosses – relationship of vertical and horizontal in eternity.
 2005 – Portraits 1994–2005 – 33 years of creativity
 2006 – Krka monastery
 2007 – Patriarch Pavle – Svetlopisi 1994 – 2007

Other projects
 September 1996 – Ep. Chrysostom, in Vrsac, Portrait of Sri Lanka.
 March 1998 – Academician Dejan Medaković, in Belgrade, closing Hilandar.
 October 1998 – Free Mileusnić in Bajina Basta, closing Hilandar.
 April 1998 – Ep. Porphyry, in Novi Sad, closing Hilandar.
 July 1998 – Artemije, attended the opening of the exhibition Approaching HILANDAR and projection slides in color Chilandar Mati Serbian spirituality, in Prizren, with the sermon Dušana Milovanovic.
 June 1999 – Irenaeus (Bulović), in Kula, closing Hilandar.
 August 1999 – Chrysostom, in Vrsac, Guardians of Holy Shrines and Porphyry, in Backa Palanka, closing Hilandar.
 October 1999 – Sreten Petkovic, in Bajina Basta, Guardians Sacred.
 March 2000 – Rector of the Prizren Seminary, Reverend Milutin Stavrophor Timotijevic, in Niš, closing Hilandar.
 March 2001 – Basil, in Sremski Karlovci, Guardians Holy Shrines
 January 2004 – Karlovac Seminary rector, Archpriest Stavrophor Dusan Petrovic, in Sremski Karlovci, Crosses.
 February 2004 – Irenaeus, in Leskovac, Crosses.
 April 2007 – Monastery cells in Kaludra. Ethnographic Museum, Belgrade, as well as in Polimskom Museum in Berane in April 2007.

Notable prizes
 1978 Gold medal in the Republican parade of artistic creation in Cacak.
 1985 Bold Flower for outstanding artistic activities and affirmation in photography in Serbia.
 1986 Belgrade City gold medal at the 32nd October Salon art photography.
 1989 Second prize in the 20th Venus International Salon of Artistic photography, Poland.
 1995 Double award Excellent Works at the VII international exhibition of art photography, Chinese Railroad Association.
 1997 First prize at 45.Republic Photo Exhibition in Belgrade.
 1993 Annual award for Creativity – ULUPUDS.
 1993 Diploma of UNICEF Serbia.
 1994 Grand Prix of the Third Biennal of Art in Miniature – International Exhibition, Gornji Milanovac.
 1998 Plaque at the 43rd International Book Fair, for a complete work of authorship Approaching Hilandar.
 1998 Annual award for Creativity – ULUPUDS.
 1999 Annual award for Creativity – ULUPUDS.
 2000 Plaque at the 45th International Book Fair, the work of authorship, Holy Watchers.
 2002 The Winner of the Golden Badge from Serbian Community of Cultural education for unselfish, dedicated, long-lasting work and creative contribution in spreading culture.

Published works – co-author
(Selection)
 Sclerotic Memoirs – Radivoje Lola Djukic – (New work, Belgrade 1987.)
 I said – Veljko Guberina – (Intermen publik-Belgrade 1991.)
 The creators and interpreters – Milos Knezevic-Dom Kulture Studentski Grad – Novi Beograd 1994th
 Modern Orthodox Serbian art Dusan Миловановић – Milovanovic – (MAA-Belgrade 1995.)
 Novel about Croatia – Bozidar Todorovic – (Belgrade 1996).
 Ljubisa Jovanovic – Johann Sebastian Bach – Music for flute, CD 1 (65:08), 2 (68:07) (PGP RTB, Belgrade 1997.)
 Hilandar 1198–1998. (Institute for Scientific Educational Cultural and Technical Cooperation, the Republic of Serbia – Belgrade 1998.) CD
 CD – Force Cross – eight centuries Hilandar (PGP RTS, Belgrade 1998.) CD
 Memoirs – Prince Tomislav of Yugoslavia -(Foundation of King Peter I, Oplenac – 1999.)
 Time in my life – Serbian Patriarch Pavle – (missionary and spiritual center of Hilandar Trojeručica – Belgrade 1999.)
 Win or disappear – Nebojsa M. Крстић – Krstic – (Rivel who – Belgrade 2000.)
 Hilandar between history and legend – Zoran-Turkana (Committee to mark 2000 g. Christianity – Vrsac 2001.)
 Box For Writing – Milorad Pavic – (Dereta-Belgrade 2000.)
 Selected poems – Stevan Raickovic-(Gramata – Podgorica, 2002.)
 The Best Song – Stevan Raickovic-(Prosveta – Belgrade, 2002.)
 Hilandar through the centuries – Z. Туркан, Д. Turkana, D. Миловановић, (Committee for the observation of 2000 g. Christianity, Vrsac, 2002.)
 Christ as a gift – Nadia Branko – (Committee for marking 2000g. Christianity – Vrsac 2001.)
 Choreographer Dimitrije Parlić – Milica Jovanovic, (Association of Ballet Artists of Serbia, Belgrade 2002.)
 World Icon Axion Estin and its Wonders in the monastery Mesic – Zoran Turkana – (Gardska Library Vrsac, 2003.)
 Face Hilandar – Milivoje Pavlović, (Prometheus – Novi Sad, 2003.)
 Renew Ourselves Lift Stup, a sound recording – CD (Society of Friends of the monastery Djurdjevi columns in the Race – Belgrade 2005.)
 Newsletters Eparchy Timok, age 11, 34th Belgrade since 2005. permanent associate.
 BELL, regular contributor since 2007.

Radio and TV appearances
(Selection)
 1994 – TV Politika – GALLERY READING – Biljana Vilimon – Portraits of contemporaries
 1998 – TV Politika – GALLERY READING – Biljana Vilimon – Hilandar
 2000 – BK TV – while asleep ANGELS – Marina Rajević-Savic – - 2000. Palma TV – with the blessing of the flow Milenjum Authors: Milutin Stankovic, Dusan Milovanovic
 2003 – Info 24 TV Theme Dsy – Culture, Nenad J. Ristic
 2006 – TV RTS 1 Belgrade Chronicle – Portraits 1994 -2005 same evening broadcast via satellite in Europe (05.06.2006.)
 2006 – TV RTS 2 Beo Kult – Portraits 1994 -2005 h (21 June 2006.)
 2006 – I am Ju radio from Belgrade – 18 June 2006. Head Ljiljana Sinđelić – Nikolic

Gift collection
 2001 Approaching HILANDAR, complete setting of 200 furnished exhibits – SERBIAN Orthodox Seminary of St. Arsenije – Srem Karlovci.
 2004 SACRED Guardians, 100 exhibits – Decani Monastery
 2005 CROSSES – ratio of the horizontal and vetrikale in eternity, 30 fully equipped exhibits. SERBIAN ORTHODOX HOLY ARSENIJE Seminary – Srem Karlovci.
 2006 PORTRAITS 1985–2006 37 exhibits – MUSEUM OF SERBIAN ORTHODOX CHURCH – Belgrade.
 2006 HILANDAR Sometimes, (architecture and portraits of former fraternity) is part of the exhibition of 21 exhibits KALUDRA monastery near Berane.
 2009 PORTRAITS of living people (219 exhibits) SERBIAN HISTORICAL MUSEUM – Belgrade

Special activities
 1995. So far in his studio shoots portraits of regular, special and foreign members Serbian Academy of Sciences and Arts, and for the bibliographic departments.
 1999 to 2001. Portrayed the Prince Tomislav, Princess Elizabeth of Greece and Denmark, and the Princess Margarita of Yugoslavia, as in his studio, and on Oplenac and published.

Citations

General sources 
Guardians of Imperial Treasure: review of Hilandar, from ex-yupress.com

1959 births
Living people
Photographers from Belgrade